Brian Hansen may refer to:

Brian Hansen (American football) (born 1960), former American football punter in the National Football League
Brian Hansen (curler) (born 1972), Danish curler, 2002 Winter Olympics participant
Brian Hansen (speed skater) (born 1990), American speed skater